Two-time defending champion Shingo Kunieda defeated Stéphane Houdet in the final, 6–2, 6–2, to win the men's singles wheelchair tennis title at the 2015 Australian Open. It was his eighth Australian Open title and 18th major singles title overall.

Houdet was bidding to win his first Australian Open title at his fourth final, having lost to Kunieda on all three previous occasions.

Seeds

Draw

References 

General

 Drawsheets on ausopen.com 

Specific

External links 
 2015 Australian Open – Wheelchair men's singles draws and results at the International Tennis Federation

Wheelchair Men's Singles
2015 Men's Singles